Sugar Creek Township is one of fourteen townships in Clinton County, Indiana. As of the 2010 census, its population was 450 and it contained 197 housing units. The township is named for the stream that flows southwest through it.

History
The first settler in the area of Sugar Creek Township was Williams Harris, who arrived in 1828, built a cabin and hunted and fished in the wilderness — he was the only white inhabitant for four years, until the arrival of farmer Abner Dunn and his family in 1832, then Merrill Cooper and blacksmith W. V. McKinney in 1835.  Though originally slow, settlement in the township increased in the 1840s and by 1850 its population was 477; by 1860 it was 719, in 1870 it was 964, and in 1880 it was 1410.

The area's residents petitioned in 1841 for their own township, a request granted by the county commissioners who formed Sugar Creek Township from a portion of Jackson.

Geography

Unincorporated towns
 Pickard

Adjacent townships
 Johnson Township (north)
 Jefferson Township, Tipton County (east)
 Adams Township, Hamilton County (southeast)
 Marion Township, Boone County (south)
 Kirklin Township (west)

Major highways
  Indiana State Road 28
  Indiana State Road 38

References
 United States Census Bureau cartographic boundary files
 U.S. Board on Geographic Names
 2010 Census information

Townships in Clinton County, Indiana
Townships in Indiana
1841 establishments in Indiana
Populated places established in 1841